Urrao is a town and municipality of Colombia, located in the subregion  southwest of the department of Antioquia. Limited by the north with the municipalities of  Frontino and Abriaquí, in the east with the municipalities of Abriaquí, Caicedo, Anzá,  Betulia and Salgar, and in the south and west with Vigía del Fuerte and the department of Chocó. It is the second largest municipality in the department. Professional cyclist Rigoberto Urán was born and raised here.

Climate
The climate is warm and temperate in Urrao. There is significant rainfall throughout the year in Urrao. Even the driest month still has a lot of rainfall. According to Köppen and Geiger, this climate is classified as Cfb. The average temperature in Urrao is 15.7 °C | 60.3 °F. About 7573 mm | 298.1 inch of precipitation falls annually.

References

Municipalities of Antioquia Department